
Zayne and Zayn are alternative ways of writing Zane.

Zayn and Zayne may refer to:

People

Zayn
Zayn Malik (born 1993), known mononymously as Zayn, British singer

Zayne
Zayne Anderson (born 1997), American football player
Zaynê Akyol (born 1987), Canadian filmmaker, producer and photographer
Zayne Emory (born 1998), American actor and singer

Fictional characters
Zayne Carrick, fictional character in the comics Star Wars: Knights of the Old Republic

See also
Zane